is a town located in Shimajiri District, Okinawa Prefecture, Japan.

Yaese was formed on January 1, 2006 by a merger between the town of Kochinda and the village of Gushikami.

As of October 2016, Yaese has a population of 29,488; with a population density of 1,100 persons per km².

Notable people from Yaese
Hitoe Arakaki, singer

References

External links
 
 
 Town of Yaese

Towns in Okinawa Prefecture